This is a chronological list of Sri Lankan wicket-keepers, that is, Test cricketers who p kept wicket in a match for Sri Lanka. Figures do not include catches made when the player was a non wicket-keeper.

See also

 List of Sri Lankan Test cricketers
 List of Sri Lankan ODI cricketers

References
Cricinfo

Test wicket-keepers
Sri Lankan wickets
Sri Lanka
Wicket-keepers